USS League Island is a name used more than once by the U.S. Navy:

 , was built in April 1907 by Neafie & Levy S. and E. B. Co., Philadelphia, Pennsylvania.
  was originally LST-1097 launched 16 January 1945.

References 

United States Navy ship names